Derby is a Metropolitan Borough of Sefton ward in the Bootle Parliamentary constituency that covers the area of the town of Bootle centred on the Derby park for which the ward is named after. The population taken at the 2011 census was 12,360.

Councillors
 indicates seat up for re-election.
 indicates by-election.

Election results

Elections of the 2020s

Elections of the 2010s

References

Wards of the Metropolitan Borough of Sefton